Portage Township, Indiana may refer to one of the following places:

 Portage Township, Porter County, Indiana
 Portage Township, St. Joseph County, Indiana

See also 

Portage Township (disambiguation)

Indiana township disambiguation pages